Mister V may refer to:

Music
 Mister V (rapper), Yvick Letexier, French YouTuber, comedian, rapper, and actor
 Mr. V, Victor Font, an American DJ, producer, and vocalist

Films and television
 "Pimpernel" Smith (released in the United States as Mister V), a 1941 British anti-Nazi thriller
 Mister V. [fr], a 2003 French film directed by Émilie Deleuze